Esmeralda Diaz Tuazon (born December 13, 1961), known professionally as Amy Austria-Ventura, is a Filipino film and television actress.

Austria is recognized as one of the defining actresses in Philippine cinema. She has won a FAMAS Award, 2 Gawad Urian Awards, 3 FAP Awards and 4 MMFF Awards (including three Best Actress wins).

The Philippine Star listed Austria mong the 15 Best Actresses of All Time. In 2019, Austria was inducted at the Hall of Fame at the Metro Manila Film Festival.

Biography
Esmeralda Tuazon was the second to the eldest among six children born in 1961 to an impoverished family. She helped the family by selling chewing gum. She studied at the Rajah Soliman High School. She was introduced to the producer Baby Martinez of MBM Productions through a common friend. She was then cast in Bitayin Si Baby Ama (1976), the movie that made a star of Rudy Fernandez. After her second film, Alas (1976), with Jun Aristorenas, she was given minor parts in several other pictures then dropped out of the movie scene for almost a year. When she came back in mid-1977, s contract star of Jesse Ejercito's Seven Star Productions. She became quite visible in the 1970s, in such films like Dabiana (1977), Miss Dulce Amor, Ina (1978), Atsay (1978), Menor de edad  (1979), Gabun: Ama Mo, Ama Ko (1979), Bedspacers (1979) and Swing It, Baby (1979). After acting in two very relevant films for 1979, Ishmael Bernal's Aliw and Lino Brocka's Jaguar, Ms Austria was finally a lead star in Nang Bumuka Ang Sampaguita (1980). At a time when female parts in Filipino cinema were strong and revolutionary, Ms Austria became a busy actress: Langis at Tubig (1980), Sugat sa ugat (1980), Goriong Butete (1980), Tondo Girl (1981), Pusong Uhaw (1982) and Waywaya (1982). In the 1990s and well into the 21st century, she still gives powerful supporting performances, in The Flor Contemplacion Story (1995), Muro-ami (1999), Anak (2000), Pagdating ng Panahon (2001), a Sharon Cuneta starrer and  I Will Always Love You (2006) starring Richard Gutierrez And Angel Locsin. Anak is her second reunion movie with veteran actress & close friend Vilma Santos, after Langis at Tubig & Paano Ba Ang Mangarap?.

In the 2000s, Austria came back to acting Via small screen in 2000; she was part of the highly acclaimed International Primetime drama Pangako Sa 'Yo or more well known as "The Promise" from 2000–2002 on ABS-CBN as Lourdes in 2003, she starred in GMA-7 oriented programs such as Kirara Anong Kulay Nang Pag Ibig? The Fantasy TV Series Mulawin from 2004-2005 and the movie adaptation turned Grand Finale of the series which was featured in 2005's Metro Manila Film Festival in her reprising role. She also made an appearance on another GMA program entitled Narito Ang Puso Ko.

In 2006, she returned to ABS-CBN for its much-awaited and commercially successful remake of Bituing Walang Ningning, which was extended for another month. She played a new character in the TV series made by novelist and comic creator Nerissa Cabral as an antagonist and mother to Angelika Dela Cruz's lead character Lavina as Barbara Arguelles the stage mother and con artist who has a share of her downfall. The series attained 42% percent high share in TV ratings. This was her second screentime with Dela Cruz. Austria accepted another for another Primetime Drama from a classic film and remake Walang Kapalit as a supporting character again from 2008 to 2010. She took a break from offers from TV and film.

In 2011, she accepted the military primetime drama Minsan Lang Kita Iibigin, which aired from March 7, 2011, to August 19, 2011. She took the role with the help from her cousin Lorna Tolentino and reunited her fellow veteran screen actors, such as Boots Anson Roa, Ronaldo Valdez, and Tonton Gutierrez, and John Estrada and her first with Coco Martin, and Maja Salvador and Andi Eigenmann.

In 2012, she starred in Lorenzo's Time with Zaijan Jaranilla, In 2013, she was seen on the lifestyle entertainment talk show Inside The Cinema with Boy Abunda on Cinema One (Movie Channel ABS-CBN Subsidiaries) and in 2014, she became a part of Ikaw Lamang on its second Book as the older version of Kim Chiu's character Isabel with fellow award-winning actors Joel Torre, Rio Locsin, Nonie Buencamino, and Christopher De Leon and also her reunion with Coco Martin, on their second series appearances. In 2015, she was seen in remake of Pangako Sa 'Yo as the adoptive mother of Kathryn Bernardo's character.

After she became part of the primetime television series Halik as the mother of Jericho Rosales's character, she returned to GMA-7 for One of the Baes.

Filmography

Television

Films

Awards and nominations

References

External links
 

1961 births
Living people
People from Tondo, Manila
Actresses from Manila
Filipino women comedians
Filipino film actresses
Filipino television actresses
GMA Network personalities
ABS-CBN personalities